Sir Aubrey Strahan KBE FRS (20 April 1852 – 4 March 1928) was a British geologist. He was elected FRS in 1903. He was Director of the Geological Survey of Great Britain from 1914–1920. He won the Wollaston Medal of the Geological Society of London in 1919.

Personal life
Aubrey Strahan  was born on 20 April 1852 in London. He was the fifth son of William Strahan and Anne Dorothea Strahan. He was raised at Blackmore Hall, near Sidmouth, until he went to Eton at the age of 13. He then went to St John's College, Cambridge (his father's college) in 1870. In May 1875 (the year of his graduation) he was employed in a temporary capacity by the Geological Survey, then headed by Andrew Ramsay, as an assistant geologist. He was to remain with the Survey for the rest of his professional life.

He married Fannie Roscoe in 1886. At this time he was mostly working in the south of England, but in 1901 became District Geologist with responsibility for South Wales. He was elected Fellow of the Royal Society in 1903, became President of the Geology Section of the British Association in 1904, and was President of the Geological Society of London in 1913 and 1914. He was Director of the Survey from 1914 until his retirement in 1920. He lived in Goring-on-Thames until his death there in 1928.

Works
During his long career, Strahan contributed to over 30 memoirs of the Geological Survey, these mostly being detailed descriptions and explanations of the areas covered by individual sheets of the Geological Map. He also published many papers in academic journals. The work for which he is best known is the extensive series of surveys of the South Wales coalfield. He was always attracted by the economic aspects of the study of geology, and this is well-reflected in the coalfield work. He was known for the high quality of his mapping work.

His appointment as Director of the Survey coincided with the outbreak of World War I, and he was responsible for adapting the survey to meet wartime needs. These included preparation of maps for the war zones (particularly relevant for areas of trench warfare); provision of staff, as geologist were needed in the field; and exploiting mineral resources for the raw materials and energy sources needed for war production. This work became the basis for a series of reports entitled Special Reports on the Mineral Resources of Great Britain, the first of which appeared in 1915

References

Selected publications

External links
  Aubrey Strahan M.A., K.B.E., D.Sc., F.R.S

1852 births
1928 deaths
Wollaston Medal winners
Fellows of the Royal Society
Knights Commander of the Order of the British Empire
People educated at Eton College
Alumni of St John's College, Cambridge